Kolchuginsky District is an administrative and municipal district (raion), one of the sixteen in Vladimir Oblast, Russia. It is located in the west of the oblast. Its administrative center is the town of Kolchugino. Population:   11,405 (2002 Census);  The population of Kolchugino accounts for 79.4% of the district's total population.

References

Notes

Sources

Districts of Vladimir Oblast